Al-Watwan  is a Comorian daily newspaper published in French and Arabic, headquartered in Moroni, Comoros.

References 

Al-Watwan
Al-Watwan
Al-Watwan
Publications with year of establishment missing